Rathkeale is a town in west County Limerick, in Ireland. It is 30 km (18 mi) southwest of Limerick city on the N21 road to Tralee, County Kerry, and lies on the River Deel. Rathkeale has a significant Irish Traveller population, and since 1995, almost half the town residents were members of the traveling community. Rathkeale also has the largest concentration of descendants of the German Palatines who immigrated to Ireland in the early 18th century.

Rathkeale has shopping facilities, a museum, two primary schools, and a community college (Coláiste na Trócaire, founded in 1995). The town has a large Roman Catholic parish church, Augustinian Abbey ruins, and the Holy Trinity Church of Ireland church.

History

On the southwestern edge of the town is the 15th-century tower house of Castle Matrix. The castle was built as a fortress during the early 1400s by Thomas FitzGerald, 7th Earl of Desmond, and was later the home of Maurice FitzGerald, 9th Earl of Desmond. It contains a display of art objects, holds historical records, and is one of a series of significant Desmond properties in County Limerick (see also Adare, Askeaton, and Newcastle West).

In the cemetery of the Holy Trinity Church are many gravestones bearing names of Irish Palatine families. These families came from Rheinland-Pfalz, in the Rhineland Palatinate, Germany as refugees in 1709. Many of their descendants now live in North America. The region around Rathkeale, namely the townlands of Killeheen, Ballingrane, and Courtmatrix, contains the largest concentration of Palatine descendants in Ireland today. Rathkeale's former railway station on the closed North Kerry railway line from Limerick to Tralee has been converted into the Irish Palatine Museum.

Transport
Bus:
Rathkeale is served by Bus Eireann routes 13 and 14 which operate between Limerick and Tralee and Killarney respectively.

Railways:
Rathkeale railway station opened on 1 January 1867, closed for passenger traffic on 4 February 1963, and permanently closed on 2 December 1974. The Great Southern Trail, an off-road trail for cyclists and walkers, is a greenway rail trail which follows the route of the former Limerick-Tralee railway line between Rathkeale and Abbeyfeale.

People
Sean (Jackie) Finn, Brigadier of the 4th (Rathkeale) West Limerick Battalion of the IRA during the Irish War of Independence was a native of Rathkeale. His grave in the local graveyard features an impressive Celtic cross.
The town is reportedly home to many members of the Rathkeale Rovers crime group, who own much of the property within the town.

Sport 
 There is a large GAA training facility in Rathkeale called Mick Neville Park, which is owned by Limerick GAA and is used by the county teams for training and some matches. It also hosts a number of club games throughout the GAA season.
 Rathkeale A.F.C., who compete in the Limerick Desmond League Premier Division, and whose home ground is at Holy Cross, just outside the north side of the town. 
 Rathkeale GAA, who have both hurling and football teams, and whose home ground "the bog garden" is just outside the town on the north side.

See also
 List of towns and villages in Ireland

References

Towns and villages in County Limerick